The 2014 Chang-Sat Bangkok Open was a professional tennis tournament played on hard courts. It was the sixth edition of the tournament which was part of the 2014 ATP Challenger Tour. It took place in Bangkok, Thailand between 25 and 31 August 2014.

Singles main-draw entrants

Seeds

 1 Rankings are as of August 18, 2014.

Other entrants
The following players received wildcards into the singles main draw:
  Phassawit Burapharitta
  Nuttanon Kadchapanan
  Pruchya Isaro
  Kittipong Wachiramanowong

The following players received entry from the qualifying draw:
  Sanjar Fayziev 
  Christopher Rungkat 
  Peerakiat Siriluethaiwattana
  Chaleechan Tanasugarn

Champions

Singles

  Hyeon Chung def.  Jordan Thompson 7–6(7–0), 6–4

Doubles

 Pruchya Isaro /  Nuttanon Kadchapanan def.  Chen Ti /  Peng Hsien-yin 6–4, 6–4

External links
Official Website

 
 ATP Challenger Tour
Tennis, ATP Challenger Tour, Chang-Sat Bangkok Open
Tennis, ATP Challenger Tour, Chang-Sat Bangkok Open

Tennis, ATP Challenger Tour, Chang-Sat Bangkok Open